Virasipillai Albert Alegacone (19 March 1903 – 25 November 1973) was a Ceylon Tamil lawyer, politician and Member of Parliament.

Early life
Alegacone was born on 19 March 1903. He was the son of Bastiampillai Virasipillai Sinniah and Annamah. He was from one of the leading families in Mannar in northern Ceylon. He was educated at St. Xavier's Boys' College, Mannar. He joined the legal profession, becoming a proctor and a notary public, and practising law in Mannar. He was president of Mannar and Jaffna Diocesan Council for a number of years.

Alegacone married Mary Sebastiammah, daughter of Bastiampillai Arasaratnam. They had five children - Arunthathie, Thevathasan, Balendra, Sathiyavan and Arichandran.

Political career
Alegacone was elected to Mannar Town Council in the 1940s. He served as the council's chairman between 1947 and 1956.

Alegacone stood as an independent candidate in Mannar at the 1952 parliamentary election but was defeated by the sitting MP C. Sittampalam. He later joined the Illankai Tamil Arasu Kachchi (Federal Party) and became an active member of the party. He was ITAK's candidate in Mannar at the 1956 parliamentary election. He won the election and entered Parliament. He was re-elected at the March 1960, July 1960, 1965 and 1970 parliamentary elections.

Alegacone died on 25 November 1973.

References

1903 births
1973 deaths
Alumni of St. Xavier's Boys' College
Ceylonese proctors
Illankai Tamil Arasu Kachchi politicians
Local authority councillors of Sri Lanka
Members of the 3rd Parliament of Ceylon
Members of the 4th Parliament of Ceylon
Members of the 5th Parliament of Ceylon
Members of the 6th Parliament of Ceylon
Members of the 7th Parliament of Ceylon
People from Mannar, Sri Lanka
People from British Ceylon
Sri Lankan Tamil lawyers
Sri Lankan Tamil politicians